Links to nations or nationalities point to articles with information on that nation's poetry or literature.  For example, "United Kingdom" links to English poetry and "India" links to Indian poetry.

Events
 June 3 – Canadian poet Charles G. D. Roberts is knighted.
 June 15
 Gay English poet W. H. Auden enters a marriage of convenience with Erika Mann.
 Premiere of T. S. Eliot's verse drama Murder in the Cathedral at Canterbury Cathedral in England.
 American poet George Oppen joins the Communist Party, where his organizing work will increasingly take precedence over his poetry; he writes no more verse until 1958.
 Picasso's poetry begins to be written.
 Tomb of Hafez in Shiraz, Persia, is rebuilt.

Works published in English

Canada
 Arthur Bourinot, Selected Poems (1915–1935).
 E. J. Pratt, The Titanic, Toronto: Macmillan.
 Kenneth Leslie, Lowlands Low: Poems. Halifax: McCurdy
 Wilson MacDonald, The Song Of The Undertow and Other Poems. Toronto, Buffalo: S.J.R. Saunders, Broadway.
 Wilson MacDonald, Quintrains Of "Callender" and Other Poems. Toronto: S.J.R. Saunders.
 Tom MacInnes, Rhymes of a Rounder, Canada
 Duncan Campbell Scott, The Green Cloister, Canada
 Francis Sherman, The Complete Poems of Francis Sherman. Lorne Pierce ed. Toronto: Ryerson.

India, in English
 Sundhindra Dutt, Orchestra ( Poetry in English ),
 Govind Krishna Chettur, The Shadow of God: A Sonnet Sequence ( Poetry in English ), London: Longmans, published in the United Kingdom 
 Nizamat Jung, Islamic Poems ( Poetry in English ), Hyderabad: Government Central Press

United Kingdom
 George Barker, Poems
 Samuel Beckett, Echo's Bones and Other Precipitates
 Norman Cameron, The Winter House
 Cecil Day-Lewis:
 Collected Poems 1929–1933
 A Time to Dance, and Other Poems
 Walter de la Mare, Poems 1919 to 1934
 T. S. Eliot, Murder in the Cathedral
 Christopher Hassall, Poems of Two Years
 Eiluned Lewis, December Apples (Welsh poet published in the United Kingdom)
 Louis MacNeice, Poems
 Herbert Read, Poems 1914–34
 James Reeves, The Natural Need (with preface, in verse, by Laura Riding)
 Siegfried Sassoon, Vigils
 Humbert Wolfe:
 The Fourth of August, sonnets
 Stings and Wings
 X at Oberammergau
 W. B. Yeats, A Full Moon in March, Irish poet published in the United Kingdom

United States
 John Peale Bishop, Minute Particulars
 Robert P. Tristram Coffin, Strange Holiness
 Countee Cullen, The Medea and Some Poems
 E. E. Cummings, No Thanks
 Kenneth Fearing, Poems
 John Gould Fletcher, XXIV Elegies
 Hamlin Garland, Iowa, O Iowa
 Horace Gregory, Chorus for Survival
 Robinson Jeffers, Solstice and Other Poems
 James Weldon Johnson, Selected Poems
 Edgar Lee Masters, Invisible Landscapes
 Marianne Moore, Selected Poems
 John G. Neihardt, The Song of the Messiah
 Edwin Arlington Robinson, King Jasper
 Muriel Rukeyser, Theory of Flight
 Karl Shapiro, Poems
 Wallace Stevens, Ideas of Order, includes "Farewell to Florida", "The Idea of Order at Key West", "Academic Discourse at Havana", "Like Decorations in a Nigger Cemetery", and "A Postcard from the Volcano"), Alcestis Press (enlarged edition, 1936)
 Robert Penn Warren, Thirty-Six Poems
 William Carlos Williams, An Early Martyr and Other Poems

Other in English
 Allen Curnow (New Zealand):
Three Poems (Caxton)
Poetry and Language, a brief poetry manifesto (Caxton)
 C. J. Dennis, The Singing Garden, Australia
 W. B. Yeats, A Full Moon in March, Irish poet published in the United Kingdom
 Rex Ingamells, Gumtops, Australia

Works published in other languages

France
 René Char, Le Marteau sans maitre
 René Daumal, Le Contre-ciel
 Paul Éluard, Facile
 Francis Jammes:
 Alouette
 De tout temps à jamais, Paris: Gallimard
 Henri Michaux, La Nuit remue
 Catherine Pozzi (died 1934), "Ave", "Vale", "Scopolamine", "Nova", "Maya" and "Nyx", published in Mesures

Indian subcontinent
Including all of the British colonies which later became India, Pakistan, Bangladesh, Sri Lanka and Nepal. Listed alphabetically by first name, regardless of surname:

Gujarati
 Balawantrai Thakore, Mharon Sonnet
 Jhaverchand Meghani, Yugavandana
 Jhinabhai Desai Snehrashmi, Arghya, the author's first poetry collection; many of the poems display patriotism and love for the poor
 Kavi Nhanalal, Ketalank Kavyo, Part 3 (Part 1 published 1903; Part 2 in 1908); the first part made Nhanalal's reputation as the best Gujarati lyric poet; the collection is known for its metrical innovations, creative power and mix of modern and old folk elements
 Kishorlal Mashruvala, translator, Vidayuelae — Kahlil Gibran's The Prophet from English into Gujarati
 Mansukhlal Jhaveri, Phooldal

Urdu
 Akbar Allahabadi, Kulliyat-i Akbar Allahabadi, in four volumes, published (fourteen years after his death in 1921) from this year through 1939; Indian, Urdu-language
 M. Diyauddin, translator, Kālam-i-Tagore, translated from the Bengali of Rabindranath Tagore, with Tagore involved in the translation, into Urdu
 Muhammad Iqbal, Bal-i Jibrial, alternate spelling: "Bal-i Jibril" ("Wings of Gabriel"), includes  and ghazals; famous poems in the volume: "Iblees Ki Majlis-e-Shura" ("The Parliament of Satan"), "Jibrail-o-Iblis", "Lenin Khuda Ke Hazur main" ("Lenin in the Court of God"), "Punjab ke Dehqan se" ("To the Punjab Peasants"); "This is regarded as a milestone in Urdu poetry", according to Indian academic Siser Kumar Das; inspired by Iqbal's 1933 visit to Spain

Other Indian languages
 Bal Krisna Rav, Abhas, Indian, Hindi-language
 Changampuzha Krishna Pillai, Baspanjali ("Offering of tears"), the author's first poetry collection, Malayalam
 Duvvuri Rami Reddi, translator, Panasala — translation of Omar Khayyám's Rubaiyat from Persian into Telugu
 Jayshankar Prasad, Kamayani, said to be the greatest poem of the Chayavadi (Indian romantic) movement; 15 cantos, each named after an emotion; Hindi
 Mahjoor, "Gristi Kur", Kashmiri poem in the Vatsan form comparing the refreshing traits of peasants as compared with less lively aristocrats; published in the August 1 issue of Hamdard
 Rabindranath Tagore, Ses Saptak, in this and in some of the author's other books in the mid-1930s, he introduced a new rhythm in poetry that "had a tremendous impact on the modern poets", according to Indian academic Sisir Kumar Das; Bengali
 Ulloor Paramesvara Iyer, Dipavali, Malayalam

Spanish language

Peru
 Xavier Abril, Difícil trabajo
 Manuel Moreno Jimeno, Los malditos
 Emilio Vasquez, Tawantinsuyo
 Emilio Adolfo von Westphalen, Abolición de la muerte

Spain
 Vicente Aleixandre:
 La destrucción o el amor ("Destruction or/as Love")
 Pasión de la tierra ("Passion of the Earth"), written 1928–1929
 Germán Bleiberg, El cantar de la noche ("The Song of the Night")
 Gabriel Celaya, Marea del silencio ("Tide of Silence")
 Federico García Lorca:
 Llanto por Ignacio Sánchez Mejías ("Lament for Ignacio Sánchez Mejías")
 Seis poemas galegos ("Six Galician poems")
 Luis Rosales, Abril ("April")

Other languages
 Constantine Cavafy, Ποιήματα (Piimata, or "Poems of C.P. Cavafy"), Greek
 Bernard Kangro, Sonetid, Estonia
 Kersti Merilaas, Loomingus, Estonia
 Giorgos Seferis, Μυθιστόρημα ("Tale of Legends"), Greek

Awards and honors
 Pulitzer Prize for Poetry - Audrey Wurdemann, Bright Ambush

Births
Death years link to the corresponding "[year] in poetry" article:
 January 14 – Labhshankar Thakar (died 2016), Indian Gujarati poet, playwright and story writer
 January 16 – Inger Christensen (died 2009), Danish poet, writer, novelist, essayist and children's book author
 January 18 – Jon Stallworthy (died 2014), English poet, literary critic and academic
 January 30 – Richard Brautigan (died 1984), American writer and poet
 January 27 – D. M. Thomas, English novelist, poet, and translator from Cornwall
 February 14 – Grigore Vieru (died 2009), Moldovan poet writing in Romanian, strong promoter of the Romanian language in Moldova
 March 13 – Kofi Awoonor (killed 2013), Ghanaian poet and author whose work combines the poetic traditions of his native Ewe people and contemporary and religious symbolism to depict Africa during decolonization
 April 4 – Michael Horovitz (died 2021), German-born English poet, translator, editor and performer
 April 6 – J. P. Clark (died 2020), Nigerian English-language poet and playwright
 April 16 – Sarah Kirsch (died 2013), German
 May 5 – Eddie Linden, British poet
 May 13 – Taku Miki 三木卓 pen name of Tomita Miki, Japanese Shōwa period poet and novelist in the Han ("Inundation") poetry circle (Surname: Miki)
 May 14 – Roque Dalton (died 1975), leftist Salvadoran poet and journalist writing about death, love and politics
 May 25 – Jay Wright, African-American poet, playwright and essayist
 May 26 – Michael Benedikt (died 2007), American poet
 June 1 – Clayton Eshleman (die 2021), American poet, translator and editor
 June 6 – Joy Kogawa, Canadian poet and novelist
 June 12 – Christoph Meckel (died 2020), German poet
 June 24 – Taufiq Ismail, Indonesian poet and activist
 July 2 – Nanni Balestrini (died 2019), Italian experimental poet, author and visual artist of the Neoavanguardia
 July 29 – Pat Lowther (murdered by her husband in 1975), Canadian poet
 August 12 – A. B. Spellman, African-American poet, music critic, music historian, arts administrator and author
 August 24 – Rosmarie Waldrop, German-born American poet and translator (primary English translator of Edmond Jabès)
 August 25 – Charles Wright, American poet
 September 10 – Mary Oliver (died 2018), American poet
 September 20 – Wong Phui Nam (died 2022), Malaysian economist and English-language poet
 September 24 – Robert Kelly, American poet associated with the deep image group
 September 30 – Arturo Corcuera (died 2017), Peruvian poet
 November 7 – Wahyu Sulaiman Rendra (died 2009), Indonesian poet, born Willibrordus Surendra Broto Rendra, popularly known as W. S. Rendra and also as "Si Burung Merak" and "The Peacock"
 November 15 – Gustaf Sobin (died 2005), American expatriate poet and novelist
 December 1 – George Bowering, Canadian novelist, poet, historian and biographer
 December 10 – Shūji Terayama 寺山 修司 (died 1983), Japanese avant-garde  poet, playwright, writer, film director and photographer (surname: Terayama)
 December 13 – Adélia Prado, Brazilian poet
 December 25 – Bhupi Sherchan (died 1989), Nepali poet
 December 27 – Syed Shamsul Haque (died 2016), Bengali poet, lyricist, playwright and essayist
 December 29 – Yevgeny Rein (Евгений Рейн), Russian poet
 Also
 Johari M. Amini (aka Jewel Christine McLawler Latimore and Johari M. Kunjufu), African American
 James Applewhite, American
 Sam Cornish, African American
 Russell Edson (died 2014), American
 Andrew Hoyem, American typographer, letterpress printer, publisher, poet and preservationist; founder and director of Arion Press in San Francisco
 Desmond O'Grady, Irish poet and translator; former editor of The Transatlantic Review and organizer of the Spoleto International Poetry Festival
 David R. Slavitt, American writer and translator
 Ahmos Zu-Bolton II, African American

Deaths
Birth years link to the corresponding "[year] in poetry" article:
 March 26 – Tekkan Yosano 与謝野 鉄幹 (born 1873), pen-name of Yosano Hiroshi, late Meiji period, Taishō and early Shōwa period Japanese author and poet; husband of author Yosano Akiko; grandfather of cabinet minister and politician Kaoru Yosano
 April 6 – Edwin Arlington Robinson (born 1869), American poet, three-time Pulitzer Prize winner
 July 17 – George William Russell (born 1867), Anglo-Irish supporter of Irish nationalism, critic, poet, and painter who wrote under the pseudonym Æ, mystical writer, and centre of a group of followers of theosophy
 August 11 – Sir William Watson (born 1858), English traditionalist poet noted for the political content of his verse
 September 18 – Alice Dunbar Nelson (born 1875), African American poet, journalist and political activist during the Harlem Renaissance; married to poet Paul Laurence Dunbar
 November 23 – Louise Mack (born 1870) Australian poet, journalist and novelist
 November 30 – Fernando Pessoa (born 1888), Portuguese poet and writer; cause of death listed as cirrhosis
 December 17 – Lizette Woodworth Reese (born 1856), American poet

See also

 Poetry
 List of poetry awards
 List of years in poetry

Notes

20th-century poetry
Poetry